The Book of Roads and Kingdoms is a 9th-century geography text written by the Persian geographer Ibn Khordadbeh. It maps and describes the major trade routes of the time within the Muslim world, and discusses distant trading regions such as Japan, Korea, and China. It was written around 870 CE, during the reign of Al-Muʿtamid of the Abbasid Caliphate, while its author was Director of Posts and Police for the Abbasid province of Jibal in modern-day Iran.

The work uses much of the Persian administrative terms, gives considerable attention to pre-Islamic Iranian history, and uses the "native Iranian cosmological division system of the world". These all show "the existence of Iranian sources at the core of the work".   

Claudius Ptolemy, Greek, and pre-Islamic Iranian history have clear influence on the work.

The book is also referred to in English as The Book of Roads and Provinces.

Notes

External links
  
اﻟﻤﺴﺎﻟﻚ واﻟﻤﻤﺎﻟﻚ
المسالك والممالك – resource for Arabic books – الوراق
المسالك والممالك لابن خرداذبة ونبذ من كتاب الخراج وصناعة الكتابة للبغدادي

9th-century Arabic books
Geographical works of the medieval Islamic world
Iranian literature
Iranian books
870
Memory of the World Register in Iran